William Harold Ingrams,  (3 February 1897 – 9 December 1973) was a British colonial administrator who served in Zanzibar, Mauritius, the Aden Protectorate, the British Zone in post-WW2 Germany, and the Gold Coast. He is best known for his posting in Mukalla, together with his wife Doreen, where he oversaw the Hadhramaut region and brokered a truce between feuding tribes known as "Ingrams' Peace".

Bibliography 
 Arabia and the Isles: Its History and Its People, with a foreword by Lt-Col Sir Bernard Reilly. John Murray, London, 1942; 3rd edition with an Introduction Covering the Recent Developments in South Western Arabia, Praeger, New York, 1966.
 Seven Across the Sahara, from Ash to Accra, John Murray, London, 1949.
 Hong Kong, HM Stationery Office, London, 1952.
 Uganda: A Crisis of Nationhood, HM Stationery Office, London, 1960.
 The Yemen: Imams, Rulers and Revolutions, John Murray, London, 1963.
 Zanzibar: Its History and Its People, Cass, London, 1967.

External links
 The Papers of Harold Ingrams held at Churchill Archives Centre
 Obituary: Harold Ingrams, CMG, OBE
 Doreen Ingrams (1906-1997)

Further reading
 A Winter in Arabia, by Freya Stark
 A Time in Arabia (1970, new edition 2013), by Doreen Ingrams

1897 births
1973 deaths
British colonial governors and administrators in Africa
Companions of the Order of St Michael and St George
Officers of the Order of the British Empire
British colonial governors and administrators in Asia
British Mauritius people
Aden Protectorate people
Gold Coast (British colony) people
Sultanate of Zanzibar people